The 19th Annual D.I.C.E. Awards is the 19th edition of the D.I.C.E. Awards, an annual awards event that honors the best games in the video game industry. It was also held as part of the Academy's 2016 D.I.C.E. Summit, and was hosted by stand up comedian Pete Holmes.

Fallout 4 won Game of the Year, was tied with Ori and the Blind Forest, Rocket League, and The Witcher 3: Wild Hunt for winning the most awards. Rise of the Tomb Raider received the most nominations. Microsoft Studios published the most award winners and was tied with Square Enix for publishing the most nominees.

Hideo Kojima, known for the Metal Gear franchise, received the Hall of Fame Award. Satoru Iwata the late former CEO of Nintendo, posthumously received the Lifetime Achievement Award. The original Visual Basic received the Technical Impact Award.

Winners and Nominees
Winners are listed first, highlighted in boldface, and indicated with a double dagger.

Special Awards

Hall of Fame
 Hideo Kojima

Lifetime Achievement
 Satoru Iwata

Technical Impact
 Visual Basic

Games with multiple nominations and awards

The following 20 games received multiple nominations:

The following five games received multiple awards:

Companies with multiple nominations

Companies that received multiple nominations as either a developer or a publisher.

Companies that received multiple awards as either a developer or a publisher.

External links

References

2016 awards
2016 awards in the United States
February 2016 events in the United States
2015 in video gaming
D.I.C.E. Award ceremonies